Albert Stewart may refer to:

 Albert Stewart (sculptor) (1900–1965), American sculptor
 Albert Stewart (rugby union) (1889–1917), Irish rugby union player and British Army officer
 Albert Oliphant Stewart (1884–1958), New Zealand tribal leader, law clerk, interpreter and local politician
 A.J.H. Stewart (1860–1917), Canadian politician

See also
Al Stewart (disambiguation)